Dark-throated thrush can refer to one of two bird species, formerly regarded as conspecific:

Black-throated thrush Turdus atrogularis
Red-throated thrush Turdus ruficollis